is a former Japanese football player and manager. current manager J2 League club of Tokyo Verdy.

Playing career
Jofuku was born in Tokushima on March 21, 1961. After graduating from Waseda University, he played for Fujitsu from 1983 to 1989.

Coaching career
After retirement, Jofuku became a coach at Fujitsu in 1993. In 1996, he was promoted to a manager. In 1999, he moved to FC Tokyo. He also became a manager for Japan U-17 national team from 2005. U-17 Japan won 2006 AFC U-17 Championship and participated in 2007 U-17 World Cup. In 2008, he became a manager for FC Tokyo. The club won the champions in 2009 J.League Cup. However, the club results were bad in the 2010 season and he was sacked in September when the club was at the 16th place of 18 clubs. In 2012, He signed with J2 League club Ventforet Kofu and led the club to won the J2 champions in the 2012 season. In 2014, the club finished at the 13th place which is best position in the club history. However, he left the club end of 2014 season. In 2016, he returned to FC Tokyo and managed the club. However, he was sacked for poor performance in July. In 2018, he signed with Sanfrecce Hiroshima. The club won the 2nd place in the 2018 season. He was named manager of Tokyo Verdy on June 15th, 2022.

Managerial statistics
Update; end of the 2022 season

References

External links

1961 births
Living people
Waseda University alumni
People from Tokushima (city)
Association football people from Tokushima Prefecture
Japanese footballers
Japan Soccer League players
Kawasaki Frontale players
Japanese football managers
J1 League managers
J2 League managers
FC Tokyo managers
Ventforet Kofu managers
Sanfrecce Hiroshima managers
Tokyo Verdy managers
Association football midfielders